The Excursion: Being a portion of The Recluse, a poem is a long poem by Romantic poet William Wordsworth and was first published in 1814 (see 1814 in poetry). It was intended to be the second part of The Recluse, an unfinished larger work that was also meant to include The Prelude, Wordsworth's other long poem, which was eventually published posthumously. The exact dates of its composition are unknown, but the first manuscript is generally dated as either September 1806 or December 1809.

Major characters

The Poet - the narrator of the poem

The Wanderer - first introduced in Book 1, "The Wanderer." Contrary to what his title might suggest, he dwells in a fixed abode but "still he loved to pace the public roads/ And the wild paths; and, when the summer's warmth/ Invited him, would often leave his home/ And journey far, revisiting those scenes" (1.416-420)

The Solitary - plagued by the death of his wife and children, as well as by his disenchantment with the French Revolution, the Solitary has chosen to live alone, wanting no more connection with the social world that has brought him so much pain.

The Pastor - A country pastor who is encountered by the Poet, the Wanderer, and the Solitary during their excursion.

Arrangement of the poem

The poem is arranged into nine books: "The Wanderer"; "The Solitary"; "Despondency"; "Despondency Corrected"; "The Pastor"; "The Churchyard Among the Mountains"; "The Churchyard Among the Mountains, continued"; "The Parsonage"; "Discourse of the Wanderer, &c.". The first and second books introduce the characters of the Wanderer and the Solitary, respectively. The third and fourth books consist of a conversation/debate between the Wanderer and the Solitary regarding the truth of Religion and the virtue of Mankind. The fifth, sixth, seventh, and eighth books introduce the character of the Pastor and consist largely of the Pastor explaining the life stories of many of the townspeople who lie buried in the country-churchyard. In the final two books, all of the aforementioned characters travel to the Parsonage, are introduced to the family of the Pastor, and eventually part ways.

References

External links

 Full text of The Excursion
 

Poetry by William Wordsworth
1814 poems
Philosophical poems